Ken Anderson (October 4, 1975 – April 3, 2009) was a professional American football defensive tackle in the National Football League. He played with the Chicago Bears in 1999. He died of a heart attack on April 3, 2009 at age 33.

References

External links
Just Sports Stats
Pro-Football reference

1975 births
2009 deaths
Players of American football from Shreveport, Louisiana
American football defensive tackles
Arkansas Razorbacks football players
Chicago Bears players
Rhein Fire players
Orlando Rage players